Twins! is the a collaborative studio album by Bob Ostertag and Otomo Yoshihide, released in 1996 by Sank-Ohso Discs and Creativeman Disc.

Track listing

Personnel
Adapted from the Twins! liner notes.

Musicians
 Bob Ostertag – Ensoniq ASR-10 sampler
 Otomo Yoshihide – electronics

Release history

References

External links 
 Twins! at Discogs (list of releases)

1996 albums
Collaborative albums
Bob Ostertag albums